Novak Djokovic defeated Andy Murray in the final, 6–4, 6–2, 6–3 to win the men's singles tennis title at the 2011 Australian Open. It was his second Australian Open title and second major title overall. 

Roger Federer was the defending champion, but lost in the semifinals to Djokovic. With his quarterfinal win over Stanislas Wawrinka, Federer broke Jack Crawford's record for the most match wins at the Australian Open.

Rafael Nadal, the 2009 champion, had the chance to become the first man since Rod Laver in 1969 to hold all four Grand Slam tournaments at once, having won the French Open, Wimbledon and US Open in 2010, but lost in the quarterfinals to David Ferrer.

This was the last Australian Open appearance for 2001 finalist and former top 10 player Arnaud Clément.

Seeds

Qualifying

Draw

Finals

Top half

Section 1

Section 2

Section 3

Section 4

Bottom half

Section 5

Section 6

Section 7

Section 8

References

External links
 
 2011 Australian Open – Men's draws and results at the International Tennis Federation

Australian Open Men's Singles
Men's Singles
Australian Open (tennis) by year – Men's singles